Ashuelot may refer to:

 The Ashuelot River in New Hampshire, United States
 The South Branch Ashuelot River in New Hampshire
 Ashuelot Pond, near the source of the Ashuelot River
 Ashuelot, New Hampshire, a village along the river
 USS Ashuelot, a gunboat named for the river
 USRC Ashuelot, a US revenue cutter named for the river